John Peter Koehler (February 24, 1880 – August 3, 1961) was an American football and basketball coach. He served as the head football coach at Lawrence Institute in Appleton, Wisconsin—now known as Lawrence University—from 1904 to 1905, at the University of Denver from 1906 to 1910, and at Marquette University from 1914 to 1915, compiling a career college football record of 39–29–4. Koehler was also the head basketball coach at Lawrence from 1905 to 1906 and at Denver from 1906 to 1909, tallying a career college basketball mark of 15–22.

Koehler was the health commissioner of Milwaukee from 1925 until his retirement in 1940.  He died on August 3, 1961, at his home in West Bend, Wisconsin, after a heart attack.

Head coaching record

Football

References

1880 births
1961 deaths
19th-century players of American football
American football centers
Basketball coaches from Wisconsin
Chicago Maroons football coaches
Denver Pioneers football coaches
Denver Pioneers men's basketball coaches
Lawrence Vikings football coaches
Lawrence Vikings men's basketball coaches
Marquette Golden Avalanche football coaches
Nebraska Cornhuskers football players
Sportspeople from Saratov Oblast
People from West Bend, Wisconsin
Russian players of American football
Emigrants from the Russian Empire to the United States